The 2015–16 SEC men's basketball season began with practices in October 2015, followed by the start of the 2015–16 NCAA Division I men's basketball season in November. Conference play started in early January 2016 and concluding in March, after which 13 member teams had participated in the 2016 SEC tournament at Bridgestone Arena in Nashville, Tennessee, with the tournament champion being guaranteed selection to the 2016 NCAA tournament.

Preseason

On March 15, 2015, Anthony Grant was fired from Alabama. On April 5, 2015, ESPN reported that Avery Johnson had verbally agreed to become the new head basketball coach at the University of Alabama, replacing Grant. The following day, the university officially announced Johnson's hiring.

On March 21, 2015 Rick Ray was fired by Mississippi State. On March 24, 2015, Ben Howland was hired as the 20th head coach of Mississippi State replacing Ray.

On March 27, 2015, Tennessee fired Donnie Tyndall after the NCAA notified Tennessee officials of possible NCAA violations at Southern Miss. The violations centered around improper financial aid for two players, as well as academic problems with junior college transfers. According to a copy of Tyndall's termination letter, Tyndall had lied to Tennessee officials about the extent of the violations on several occasions, and had also deleted several emails from an old email account even though he was aware he would have been questioned about activity on that account by the NCAA. At a press conference announcing Tyndall's firing, athletics director Dave Hart said that he would have never hired Tyndall had the true extent of the violations at Southern Miss been known. Texas head coach Rick Barnes was named Tyndall's replacement.

On April 30, 2015, Billy Donovan agreed to a $30 million, multi-year deal to coach the Oklahoma City Thunder, replacing Scott Brooks who previously coached the Thunder for seven seasons. On May 7, 2015, Louisiana Tech head coach Mike White was named as Donovan's replacement.

Media Day selections

() first place votes

Preseason  All-SEC teams

Coaches select 8 players
Players in bold are choices for SEC Player of the Year

Head coaches

Note: Stats shown are before the beginning of the season. Overall and SEC records are from time at current school.

Rankings

SEC regular season
On January 13, 2016, Missouri announced that it would not participate in any postseason play in 2016, including the SEC Tournament. At the time, the Tigers were facing an NCAA investigation into major rules violations that occurred under the tenure of former head coach Frank Haith.

Conference matrix
This table summarizes the head-to-head results between teams in conference play.

Postseason

SEC Tournament

The conference tournament is scheduled for Wednesday–Sunday, March 9–13, 2016 at the Bridgestone Arena, Nashville, Tennessee. Teams will be seeded by conference record, with ties broken by record between the tied teams followed by record against the regular-season champion, if necessary.

The tournament will involve only 13 teams after Missouri self-imposed a postseason ban.

{| class="wikitable" style="white-space:nowrap; font-size:90%;"
|-
| colspan="10" style="text-align:center; background:#DDDDDD; font:#000000" | 2016 SEC men's basketball tournament seeds and results
|- bgcolor="#efefef"
! Seed
! School
! Conf.
! Over.
! Tiebreaker
! First roundMarch 9
! Second roundMarch 10
! QuarterfinalsMarch 11
! SemifinalsMarch 12
! ChampionshipMarch 13
|-
|1.
| ‡Texas A&M
|13–5
|24–7
|1–0 vs. Kentucky
| style="background:#bfb;"| Bye
| style="background:#bfb;"| Bye
| style="background:#bfb;"| vs. #8 FloridaW, 72–66
| style="background:#bfb;"| vs. #4 LSUW, 71–38
| style="background:#fbb;"| vs. #2 KentuckyL, 77–82OT
|-
|2.
| †Kentucky
|13–5
|23–8
|0–1 vs. Texas A&M
| style="background:#bfb;"| Bye
| style="background:#bfb;"| Bye
| style="background:#bfb;"| vs. #10 AlabamaW, 85–59
| style="background:#bfb;"| vs. #6 GeorgiaW, 93–80
| style="background:#bfb;"| vs. #1 Texas A&MW, 82–77OT
|-
|3.
| †South Carolina
|11–7
|24–7
|2–0 vs. LSU/Vanderbilt
| style="background:#bfb;"| Bye
| style="background:#bfb;"| Bye
| style="background:#fbb;"| vs. #6 GeorgiaL, 64–65
| 
| 
|-
|4.
| †LSU 
|11–7
|18–13
|1–1 vs. S. Carolina/Vanderbilt
| style="background:#bfb;"| Bye
| style="background:#bfb;"| Bye
| style="background:#bfb;"| vs. #12 TennesseeW, 84–75
| style="background:#fbb;"| vs. #1 Texas A&ML, 38–71
| 
|-
|5.
| #Vanderbilt
|11–7
|19–13
|0–2 vs. South Carolina/LSU
| style="background:#bfb;"| Bye
| style="background:#fbb;"| vs. #12 TennesseeL, 65–67
| 
| 
| 
|-
|6.
| #Georgia
|10–8
|17–12
|2–0 vs. South Carolina
| style="background:#bfb;"| Bye
| style="background:#bfb;"| vs. #11 Mississippi StateW, 79–69
| style="background:#bfb;"| vs. #3 South CarolinaW, 65–64
| style="background:#fbb;"| vs. #2 KentuckyL, 80–93
| 
|-
|7.
| #|Ole Miss
|10–8
|20–11
|0–1 vs. South Carolina
| style="background:#bfb;"| Bye
| style="background:#fbb;"| vs. #10 AlabamaL, 73–81
| 
| 
| 
|-
| 8.
| #Florida|9–9
|19–13
|1–0 vs. Arkansas
| style="background:#bfb;"| Bye
| style="background:#bfb;"| vs. #9 ArkansasW, 68-61| style="background:#fbb;"| vs. #1 Texas A&ML, 66-72| 
| 
|-
| 9.
| #Arkansas|9–9
|16–16
|0–1 vs. Florida
| style="background:#bfb;"| Bye
| style="background:#fbb;"| vs. #8 FloridaL, 61-68| 
| 
| 
|-
|10.
| #Alabama'|8–10
|17–13
|
| style="background:#bfb;"| Bye
| style="background:#bfb;"| vs. #7 Ole MissW, 83-71| style="background:#fbb;"| vs. #2 KentuckyL, 59-85| 
| 
|-
|11.
| #Mississippi St.|7–11
|14–16
| 
| style="background:#bfb;"| Bye
| style="background:#fbb;"| vs. #6 GeorgiaL, 69-79| 
| 
| 
|-
|12.
|Tennessee|6–12
|15–18
|
| style="background:#bfb;"| vs. #13 AuburnW, 97–59
| style="background:#bfb;"| vs. #5 VanderbiltW, 67–65
| style="background:#fbb;"| vs. #4 LSUL, 75-84| 
| 
|-
|13.
| Auburn|5–13
|11–19
|
| style="background:#fbb;"| vs. #12 TennesseeL, 59–97
| 
| 
| 
| 
|-
| colspan="10" style="text-align:left;|‡ – SEC regular season champions, and tournament No. 1 seed.† – Received a double-Bye in the conference tournament.# – Received a single-Bye in the conference tournament.Overall records include all games played in the SEC tournament.
|-
|}

NCAA tournament

 National Invitation Tournament 

NBA Draft

Honors and awards
Players of the Week
All-Americans

Starting on March 6, the 2016 NCAA Men's Basketball All-Americans were released for 2015–16 season, based upon selections by the four major syndicates. The four syndicates include the Associated Press, USBWA, NABC, and Sporting News.APFirst TeamUSBWAFirst TeamBen Simmons, LSUSecond TeamTyler Ulis, KentuckyNABCFirst TeamSporting NewsFirst TeamTyler Ulis, KentuckySecond Team'''
Ben Simmons, LSU

All-SEC awards and teams

Coaches

References

External links
SEC website